TLH or tlh may mean:

Tax loss harvesting, an investment technique
The Loud House, a 2016 cartoon broadcast on Nickelodeon
The Lutheran Hymnal
TLH, the IATA code for Tallahassee International  Airport in the state of Florida, US
tlh, the ISO 639-3 code for the Klingon language, a fictional constructed language spoken in the Star Trek universe
TLH, the National Rail code for Tilehurst railway station in the county of Berkshire, UK
Total laparoscopic hysterectomy
Transcendental law of homogeneity, in mathematics
Trans-Labrador Highway, a highway in eastern Canada
Tréfileries et Laminoirs du Havre (Le Havre Wire-Drawing and Rolling Mills), a French manufacturer of copper products

See also